Unstrut-Hainich-Kreis is a Kreis (district) in the north of Thuringia, Germany. Neighboring districts are (from the north clockwise) the districts Eichsfeld, Kyffhäuserkreis, Sömmerda, Gotha, Wartburgkreis and the district Werra-Meißner in Hesse.

History
The district was created on July 1, 1994, by merging the two previous districts Mühlhausen and Bad Langensalza.

Partnerships
The district has a partnership with the Wetteraukreis in Hesse dating back to the German reunification of 1990. The district also has a partnership with the Lithuanian districts Ukmerge and Raseiniai.

Geography
The district is named after the river Unstrut and a hill chain, the Hainich. The Hainich became the 13th national park of Germany in 1997.

Coat of arms
The coat of arms combines the symbols of the historical territories which make up the area of the district. In the top left is the eagle of the city Mühlhausen, in the top right the lion as the symbol of the dukes of Thuringia. In the bottom left is the Wheel of Mainz, and the deer antler in the bottom  right is the symbol of the Principality of Schwarzburg-Sondershausen.

Towns and municipalities

{|
|-----
!Verwaltungsgemeinschaft-free towns!!colspan=2|and municipalities
|-
|valign=top|
Bad Langensalza
Mühlhausen
Nottertal-Heilinger Höhen
|valign=top|
Großvargula
Herbsleben
Kammerforst
Körner
Marolterode
Oppershausen
|valign=top|
Rodeberg
Schönstedt
Südeichsfeld
Unstrut-Hainich
Unstruttal
Vogtei
|}

References

External links
Official website (German)

 
Districts of Thuringia